ASEAN University Games (AUG) is a biennial sports event that involves athletes from the universities of the ASEAN member countries. It is regulated by ASEAN University Sports Council (AUSC) which was established in 1980.

Sports

 Athletics
 Basketball
 Badminton
 Football
 Petanque
 Pencak silat
 Sepak Takraw
 Shooting
 Swimming
 Table Tennis
 Tennis
 Taekwondo
 Volleyball
 Rugby sevens
 Archery
 Beach Volleyball
 Bowling
 Chess
 Chinlone
 Diving
 Field Hockey
 Futsal
 Golf
 Judo
 Lawn bowls
 Netball
 Squash
 Vovinam
 Wushu

Participating nations

List of ASEAN University Games
</onlyinclude>

Note
 Originally scheduled for 13–22 December 2020, previously postponed to 18–27 June 2021, 22–30 June 2022 and finally to 26th July - 6th August 2022.

External links

 Results system
 Chiang Mai Mail 2010 ASEAN University Games Newsletter
 International Games
 AUSC Facebook

References

 
ASEAN sports events
Multi-sport events in Asia
Student sports competitions